Ulla Pedersen Tørnæs (born 4 September 1962 in Esbjerg) is a Danish politician, who is a member of the Folketing for the Liberal Party. She previously sat in parliament from 1994 to 2014, and served as member of the European Parliament from 2014 to 2016. She served as Minister for Development Cooperation from 2016 to 2019, Minister of Higher Education and Science in 2016, Minister of Development Cooperation from 2005 to 2010 and Minister of Education from 2001 to 2005.

Political career

Role in Danish politics
Tørnæs served as Minister for Education in the Cabinet of Anders Fogh Rasmussen I (2001–2005) and as Minister for Development Cooperation in the Cabinet of Anders Fogh Rasmussen II from 18 February 2005. From 2007, she was a member of the World Bank Group’s High Level Advisory Council on Women's Economic Empowerment, which was chaired by Danny Leipziger and Heidemarie Wieczorek-Zeul. She was also a member of the Prime Minister’s Commission on Effective Development Cooperation with Africa which held meetings between April and October 2008. From 2010 until 2016, Tørnæs was a member of the management committee of the Danish Liberal Democracy Programme (DLDP).

Member of the European Parliament, 2014–2016
Tørnæs became a Member of the European Parliament following the 2014 European elections. A member of the ALDE (Group of the Alliance of Liberals and Democrats for Europe) political faction, she served as Vice-Chairwoman of the Committee on Employment and Social Affairs. In 2015, she was the lead negotiator for the ALDE group on the eCall system. In addition to her committee assignments, Tørnæs was a member of the parliament’s delegation for relations with the countries of Southeast Asia and the Association of Southeast Asian Nations (ASEAN).

Return to Danish politics
Tørnæs left the European Parliament on 29 February 2016, becoming Minister for Science, Technology, Information and Higher Education in the Lars Løkke Rasmussen II Cabinet, where she proposed the education ceiling. Her successor is Morten Løkkegaard. From 28 November 2016 until 2019, Tørnæs again served as Minister for Development Cooperation.

Personal life
Tørnæs is the daughter of former minister Laurits Tørnæs and Katty Tørnæs.

References

External links
 
  Personal website of Ulla Tørnæs

1962 births
Living people
People from Esbjerg
Government ministers of Denmark
Education ministers of Denmark
Venstre (Denmark) politicians
21st-century women MEPs for Denmark
MEPs for Denmark 2014–2019
Women members of the Folketing
Women government ministers of Denmark
21st-century Danish women politicians
Université Savoie-Mont Blanc alumni
Members of the Folketing 1994–1998
Members of the Folketing 1998–2001
Members of the Folketing 2001–2005
Members of the Folketing 2005–2007
Members of the Folketing 2007–2011
Members of the Folketing 2011–2015
Members of the Folketing 2019–2022